The German Center for Neurodegenerative Diseases (German: Deutsches Zentrum für Neurodegenerative Erkrankungen, (DZNE)) is an interdisciplinary research institution that investigates neurodegenerative disease in all its facets. It is one of six "centers for health research" founded by the German Ministry of Education and Research (BMBF) to combat the most important and widespread diseases. The DZNE is part of the Helmholtz Association of German Research Centres.

Organisation and History 

The center's declared aim is to develop new preventive and therapeutic approaches for neurodegenerative diseases. To accomplish this the DZNE follows a translational approach. This means that fundamental research is closely related to clinical research, population studies, and health care research. At each site, the DZNE works closely with universities, university hospitals, and other partners. The DZNE receives 90 percent of its funding from the Federal Ministry of Education and Research and 10 percent from the respective federal states containing DZNE sites.

Locations 

In total there are 10 sites all over Germany: Berlin, Bonn, Dresden, Göttingen, Magdeburg, Munich, Rostock / Greifswald, Tübingen, Ulm and Witten.

References

University of Bonn
Organisations based in Bonn
Medical research institutes in Germany